Wolfenstein: Cyberpilot is a first-person shooter video game developed by Arkane Lyon in conjunction with MachineGames and published by Bethesda Softworks. A spin-off in the Wolfenstein series, Cyberpilot is a virtual reality experience. The game was released for Windows PC and PlayStation 4 in July 2019. It received mixed or average reviews upon release.

Gameplay
Unlike previous entries, Cyberpilot is a virtual reality experience. Cyberpilot is a side story that takes place chronologically a week prior to the events of Wolfenstein: Youngblood. Set twenty years after the events of The New Colossus, the protagonist is depicted as a computer hacker known as Cyberpilot who works for the French Resistance against the Nazi regime. Through hacking, the player character takes over hostile armored war machines and uses them against Nazi soldiers. The game features four levels and three pilotable machines, including the Panzerhund, the Zitadelle, and a small drone for a stealth mission. During combat, players can occasionally deploy a shield to defend themselves. In between missions, players can explore a Resistance bunker.

Development
Cyberpilot was primarily developed by Arkane Studios in Lyon, with franchise developer MachineGames providing additional development. Arkane Lyon envisioned the game as a "different" kind of Wolfenstein game, and therefore, did not try to emulate the gameplay of the main games in the series. The game was announced by publisher Bethesda Softworks during its press conference during E3 2018. It was released on July 26, 2019 for Windows PC and PlayStation 4.

Both Cyberpilot and Youngblood were the first in the franchise to make use of the "social adequacy clause" introduced by Unterhaltungssoftware Selbstkontrolle (USK; the German software ratings board) in August 2018, which allowed the use of Nazi imagery and symbols in video games in relevant scenarios, reviewed on a case-by-case basis. Despite being officially rated by USK, major German retailers, such as MediaMarkt, Saturn, and GameStop, refused to sell the uncensored version, offering only the separately sold German version, which lacks all Nazi imagery and references and features German as the only language option.

Reception
The game received generally "mixed or average" reviews upon release according to review aggregator Metacritic.

The game's visuals and presentation received some praise. Many critics criticized the combat for its simplicity and clunkiness, and remarked that firearms in the game lacked a sense of impact. Critics were also disappointed by the game's thin narrative, feeling that they did not reach the standard set by previous Wolfenstein games. Its short length and lack of replayability was also criticized.

References

External links
 

2019 video games
Action-adventure games
Arkane Studios games
Bethesda Softworks games
Dystopian video games
First-person shooters
Hacking video games
MachineGames games
Nazis in fiction
Nazism in fiction
PlayStation 4 games
PlayStation VR games
Retrofuturistic video games
Single-player video games
Video game spin-offs
Video games about Nazi Germany
Video games developed in France
Video games developed in Sweden
Video games set in Paris
Video games set in 1980
Windows games
Wolfenstein
Video games about World War II alternate histories
Virtual reality games